Birch House is a historic home located at Falls Church, Virginia. It was built in the 1840s, as a -story, Greek Revival frame I-house dwelling. It was enlarged to two stories in the 1850s. It was again enlarged in 1873, by an extension across the rear of the original dwelling. A porch across the front was added much later.  It was the home of Joseph Edward Birch and his descendants.
The house is now owned by former City of Falls Church Vice Mayor and Mrs. Samuel A. Mabry. The Mabrys purchased the house in 1984. The garden has been featured in the Virginia State Garden show twice.

It was listed on the National Register of Historic Places in 1977.

References

Houses on the National Register of Historic Places in Virginia
Greek Revival houses in Virginia
Houses completed in 1845
Houses in Falls Church, Virginia
National Register of Historic Places in Falls Church, Virginia